Romeno Tumellero (born 2 February 1948 in Arcugnano) is an Italian former cyclist.

Major results

1965
3rd National Road Race Championships
1967
1st Trofeo Alcide Degasperi
1969
1st Coppa Sabatini
1970
3rd Giro di Toscana
3rd GP Montelupo
1971
1st Stage 4 Tour de Romandie
1st Stage 8 Giro d'Italia
2nd Züri-Metzgete
1972
2nd Sassari-Cagliari

References

1948 births
Living people
Italian male cyclists
Italian Giro d'Italia stage winners
Cyclists from the Province of Vicenza